Fall of Rome is a play-by-mail game that was published by Enlightened Age Entertainment.

Development
Fall of Rome is a computer-moderated turn-based game with a web interface. Rick McDowell designed the game. Playtesting was completed in 1996.

Gameplay
The game setting is after the fall of the Roman Empire. Twelve players lead kingdoms during gameplay that involves covert action and combat.

Reception
Rick Ghan reviewed the game in the October–November 2004 issue of Flagship magazine. He praised it for its excitement and detail, stating that "Fall of Rome is a thrilling and complex strategy game sure to challenge the most avid gamer."

Fall of Rome won the Origins Award for Best Play-By-Mail Game of 2004.

Notes

References

Origins Award winners
Play-by-mail games